Self-denial (related but different from self-abnegation or self-sacrifice) is an act of letting go of the self as with altruistic abstinence – the willingness to forgo personal pleasures or undergo personal trials in the pursuit of the increased good of another. Various religions and cultures take differing views of self-denial, some considering it a positive trait and others considering it a negative one. According to some Protestants, self-denial is considered a superhuman virtue only obtainable through Jesus. Some critics of self-denial suggest that self-denial can lead to self-hatred.

Positive effects
There is evidence brief periods of fasting, a denial of food, can be beneficial to health in certain situations. Self-denial is sometimes related to inhibitory control and emotional self-regulation, the positives of which are dealt with in those articles. As people grow accustomed to material goods they often experience hedonic adaptation, whereby they get used to the finer things and are less inclined to savor daily pleasures. Scarcity can lead people to focus on enjoying an experience more deeply, which increases joy.

Negative effects
Others argue self-denial involves avoidance and holding back of happiness and pleasurable experiences from oneself that is only damaging to other people. Some argue it is a form of micro-suicide because it is threatening to an individual's physical health, emotional well-being, or personal goals.

Religion and self-denial
Self-denial can constitute an important element of religious practice in various belief systems. An exemplification is the self-denial advocated by several Christian confessions where it is believed to be a means of reaching happiness and a deeper religious understanding, sometimes described as 'becoming a true follower of Christ'. The foundation of self-denial in the Christian context is based on the recognition of a higher God-given will, which the Christian practitioner chooses to adhere to, and prioritize over his or her own will or desires. This can in daily life be expressed by renunciation of certain physically pleasureable, yet from a religious stand-point inappropriate activities, sometimes referred to as 'desires of the flesh', which e.g. could entail certain sexual practices and over-indulgent eating or drinking. In the Christian faith, Jesus is often mentioned as a positive example of self-denial, both in relation to the deeds performed during his life, as well as the sacrifice attributed to his death.

See also
 Altruistic suicide
 Asceticism
 Atlas personality
 Generosity
 Human sacrifice
 John 15 (Section 13)
 Journey of self-discovery

References

Altruism
Sacrifice
Self